William Ketchum may refer to:

 William M. Ketchum (1921–1978), U.S. Representative from California
 William Ketchum (mayor) (1798–1876), mayor of Buffalo, New York, 1844–1845
 William Scott Ketchum (1813–1871), U. S. Army officer before and during the American Civil War